Neoclytus scutellaris is a species of beetle in the family Cerambycidae. Described by Olivier in 1790,  it is found in the United States.

References

External links 
 

Neoclytus
Beetles described in 1790